The 1993 Volta a la Comunitat Valenciana was the 51st edition of the Volta a la Comunitat Valenciana road cycling stage race, which was held from 23 February to 28 February 1993. The race started in Torrevieja and finished in Valencia. The race was won by Julián Gorospe of the  team.

General classification

References

Volta a la Comunitat Valenciana
Volta a la Comunitat Valenciana
Volta a la Comunitat Valenciana
Volta a la Comunitat Valenciana